Dawn of the Cycads is a compilation album by Birdsongs of the Mesozoic, released on September 30, 2008 by Cuneiform Records. It comprises much of the band's 1980s output, including Birdsongs of the Mesozoic, Magnetic Flip and Beat of the Mesozoic in addition to three bonus tracks recorded during the same era and a live performance recording from 1987 retroactively titled Between the Fires.

Track listing

Personnel 
Adapted from Dawn of the Cycads liner notes.

Birdsongs of the Mesozoic
 Erik Lindgren: Minimoog, Memorymoog, drum machine, percussion
 Roger Miller: grand piano, Yamaha CP-70, percussion
 Rick Scott: Farfisa organ, Yamaha DX7, percussion
 Martin Swope: electric guitar, percussion
Additional musicians
 Your Neighborhood Saxophone Quartet: on "[Excerpts from] The Rite of Springs" and "The Fundamental"
 Michael Cohen: snare drum, rototoms and cymbal (1.1–1.16)
 Peter Prescott: tom toms on "Triassic, Jurassic, Cretaceous" and "POP Triassic"
 Steve Stain: percussion on "Triassic, Jurassic, Cretaceous" and "POP Triassic"
 Taki: percussion on "Shiny Golden Snakes" and "Bridge Underwater"
 Leon Janikian: Clarinet on "Sound Valentine"

Production and additional personnel
 Richard W. Harte – production, recording (2.6–2.13)
 Ted Jensen – remastering
 Tony Volante – recording (2.1–2.5), mixing (1.6–1.16, 2.1–2.5)
 Jeff Whitehead – recording (1.1–1.19), mixing (1.1–1.5, 1.19)
 Bob Winsor – mixing (1.17, 1.18)

Release history

References

External links 
 Dawn of the Cycads at Discogs (list of releases)
 Dawn of the Cycads at Bandcamp

2008 compilation albums
Birdsongs of the Mesozoic albums
Cuneiform Records compilation albums